Stage Struck is a 1925 American silent comedy film starring Gloria Swanson, Lawrence Gray, Gertrude Astor, and Ford Sterling. The film was directed by Allan Dwan, and released by Paramount Pictures with the opening and ending sequences filmed in the early two-color Technicolor.

Plot
As described in a film magazine review, Jennie Hagan, a waitress in a river town restaurant is in love with Orme Wilson, the hot cake artist, who is fond of actresses. She struggles hard to win him, even studying acting, and dreaming about the stage, and after many trials is successful.

Cast

Production notes
The majority of the film was shot in location in New Martinsville, West Virginia. Other sequences were shot at the Astoria Studio in Astoria, Queens.

Preservation

In 2004, the film, including its Technicolor sequences, was restored by the George Eastman House film archive. A copy of the film is also in the British Film Institute collection.

See also
 List of early color feature films

References

External links

 
 
 
 
  Swedish poster for Stage Struck(Wayback Machine)
 US Paramount lobby poster
 Window card
 

1925 films
1925 comedy films
1920s color films
Silent American comedy films
American silent feature films
Films about actors
Films directed by Allan Dwan
Films shot in New York City
Films shot in West Virginia
Films shot at Astoria Studios
Paramount Pictures films
Silent films in color
1920s American films